Trebyan is a hamlet in Cornwall, England, United Kingdom. It is half a mile west of Lanhydrock.

References

Hamlets in Cornwall